Earle O. Latham (1908–1999) was born in Lowell, Massachusetts.

Biography

Education
He attended Boston University, Rutgers University School of Banking and Columbia University Graduate School of Management.

Career
During 46 years of employment, Latham rose from a messenger to serve as the First Vice President of the Federal Reserve Bank of Boston. He was designated as a special emissary for the U.S. Department of State to the State of Ethiopia in 1963-1964 to establish the National Bank of Ethiopia.

Personal life
Latham married Harriet Irene Morrison of Malden, Massachusetts in 1936. They had two children; Patricia Ruth Latham (1938–1956) and O. Bradley Latham (1940-). Earle Latham taught banking at Harvard University Extension School. He was an officer of the American Bankers Association and served on many boards of charitable organizations, such as the United Way.

Retirement
In retirement, he moved to Boxford, Massachusetts, where he served for many years as the Chairman of the Boxford Conservation Commission.

1908 births
1999 deaths
20th-century American businesspeople
American bankers
American Bankers Association
Boston University alumni
Columbia Business School alumni
Harvard University staff
Rutgers University alumni